New Brigade is the debut album by Danish punk rock band Iceage.

Reception

New Brigade was well received by critics upon release. At Metacritic, which assigns a normalized rating out of 100 to reviews from mainstream critics, the album has received an average score of 85, based on 18 reviews, indicating "universal acclaim".

New Brigade received Pitchforks "Best New Music" designation, with critic David Bevan praising it as a "refreshing and extraordinary debut". He continued, "These four have located a punk-rock sweet spot: mixing the black atmosphere of goth, the wild-limbed whoosh of hardcore, and the clangor of post-punk. It's a feat made all the more impressive by one very important intangible: energy." David Malitz of The Washington Post also praised the debut, saying that "In an era of rock-gone-easy-listening and endless reunions, New Brigade is a reminder of how powerful a noisy, new band with something to prove can sound. The kids maintain an unrelenting intensity throughout the album’s 12 songs."

Pitchfork placed the album at number 37 on its list of the top 50 albums of 2011,

Accolades

Track listing

Personnel
Iceage
 Elias Bender Rønnenfelt – vocals, guitar
 Johan Surrballe Wieth – guitar
 Jakob Tvilling Pless – bass
 Dan Kjær Nielsen – drums

Technical personnel
 Jens Benz – engineering, mixing
 Nis Bysted – mixing
 Iceage – mastering, mixing
 Alberte Karrebæk – photography
 Peter Schneidermann – mastering

References

2011 debut albums
Iceage albums